W. W. Fincher Jr. (May 16, 1914 – April 15, 2006) was an American politician. He served as a Democratic member for the 54th district of the Georgia State Senate.

Life and career 
Fincher was born in Cherokee County, Georgia. He attended Canton High School and the University of South Carolina.

In 1965, Fincher was elected to represent the 54th district of the Georgia State Senate, serving until 1991.

Fincher died in April 2006 at the Hamilton Medical Center, at the age of 91.

References 

1914 births
2006 deaths
People from Cherokee County, Georgia
Democratic Party Georgia (U.S. state) state senators
20th-century American politicians
University of South Carolina alumni